Bath Cricket Club is an English amateur cricket club based in the city of Bath, Somerset. The club was founded in 1859 and the Men's 1st XI compete in the West of England Premier League, which is an accredited  ECB Premier League, the highest level for recreational club cricket in England and Wales. Bath Cricket Club currently run four Men's teams, and two Women's Teams. In 2003 Bath Cricket Club merged with Somerset Wanderers Women's cricket team. The Women's teams use the playing name of Bath Wanderers. The Women's 1st XI play in the National Women's Premier League - South Division. This is also the highest level for recreational clubs. Bath CC Men’s 1st XI won the ECB National Club Championship in 2021.

Home matches are played at the North Parade Ground in Bath, which hosted a Women's One Day International match between England and India in August 2008. The ground had previously been the venue for two women's Twenty20 internationals in 2007, when England played New Zealand.

History
Bath Cricket Club was formed in 1859, by a group from Bath's YMCA. The club initially played its home matches at Claverton Down, on the southern edge of Bath, but soon bought a ground closer to the centre of Bath from the 4th Duke of Cleveland, known as the Watermeadows, for £200. This became the North Parade Ground that the club have played on ever since. Having initially been called the Bath Association Cricket Club, in 1872 the club was renamed Bath Cricket Club. The men's first XI at the club was successful throughout the 1990s and 2000s, never finishing lower than fifth from 1991 onwards, and being champions in 1994, 1998, 1999, 2000, 2003, 2005, 2006, 2008, and 2010.

In 2011, for the first time in their history, Bath Cricket Club added the name of a sponsor onto their shirts, a move which the club say was necessary for their cricket school.

Senior Honours

Men
West of England Premier League
Champions: 2022, 2017, 2016, 2013, 2011, 2010, 2008, 2006, 2005, 2003, 2000, and 1999
Runners-Up: 2019, 2018, 2014, 2012, 2004, 2002
Western League (pre-1999)
Champions: 1998, 1994 and  1974
Runners-Up: 1996, 1991
ECB National Club Cricket Championship
Champions: 2021
Runners-up: 1998, 2001, 2003

Women
A partnership started in 2001 with Somerset Wanderers Ladies Cricket Club, and this led to a merger which places the Club at the leading edge of female community cricket development. Many girls play in predominantly boys teams, and also in senior men's teams.  There are three female senior sides (known as Bath Wanderers) and the Club provides the majority of female players for Somerset and several at international level.
Women's First XI - National Premier League
National Club Champions 2015
Winners of National Premier League (South): 2007
Runners-up in National Premier League (South): 2010, 2011
Women's Second XI - National Premier League
South West Regional League Champions 2008
Gloucestershire Women's League Runners-up 2006
Somerset League Champions 2014, 2013

Youth
Bath Cricket have a strong record in developing youth cricket; the Youth set-up is quite strong with many players who play for Somerset. Bath operate youth teams from under 11 to U15 age groups, including girls teams. The youth teams largely play in the Bath & District Youth League; they also enter the national cricket youth competitions.

Youth Honours (National):-

Lady Taverners U13 National Girls Competition - Champions 2003
Portman BS U15 National Boys Competition - Finalists 2003
Portman BS U15 National Boys Competition - Champions 2004 & 2012
Lady Taverners U15 National Girls Competition - Runners-up 2004 & 2006
Boys U13 National Competition - Champions 2007
Boys U13 National t20 Competition - Champions 2022

References

External links

 Bath Cricket Club official website

English club cricket teams
Cricket Club
1859 establishments in England
Cricket in Somerset
Sports clubs founded by the YMCA